Baglioni Hotels S.p.A. is the only Italian luxury hospitality brand managing boutiques hotels located in historical buildings of major Italian Art cities - Venice, Florence and Rome - one in London and two in France (Aix-en-Provence and Saint Paul de Vence). The Baglioni Collection also includes three Resorts located in beautiful natural settings: one is in Punta Ala Tuscany on the edge of the Maremma area, one in the Maldives on the island of Maagau, in Dhaalu atoll, and one in the marine protected area of Tavolara on Sardinia’s north-east coast, close to San Teodoro, opening in June 2021.

History

In 1974, Commendatore Roberto Polito bought his first property in Tuscany Baglioni Resort Cala del Porto in Punta Ala Tuscany and founded Baglioni Hotels Group.
In 1988, the company bought the Baglioni Hotel Luna in Venice.
In 1989, the company bought the Baglioni Hotel Regina in Rome.
In 1992, the company bought the Baglioni Hotel Carlton in Milan.
In 1998, the company bought three hotels in France.
In 2004, Baglioni Hotels inaugurated the Baglioni Hotel London.
In 2009, the Baglioni Relais Santa Croce in Florence was included in the Baglioni Collection.
In 2011, Guido Polito, Roberto's son, was appointed CEO of the Group
In 2014, Baglioni Hotels & Resorts celebrated its first 40 years of history.
In 2019, the company inaugurated its first resort abroad, the Baglioni Resort Maldives on the island of Maagau, in Dhaalu atoll.
In 2021, the company inaugurates the Baglioni Resort Sardinia on Sardinia’s north-east coast, close to San Teodoro.

References

Cites

External links
 
 

Hotel chains in Italy